Stawki may refer to the following places in Poland:
Stawki Landscape Park, a protected area in Silesian Voivodeship (southern Poland)
Stawki, Kuyavian-Pomeranian Voivodeship (north-central Poland)
Stawki, Janów Lubelski County in Lublin Voivodeship (east Poland)
Stawki, Włodawa County in Lublin Voivodeship (east Poland)
Stawki, Kozienice County in Masovian Voivodeship (east-central Poland)
Stawki, Gmina Dobra in Greater Poland Voivodeship (west-central Poland)
Stawki, Gmina Władysławów in Greater Poland Voivodeship (west-central Poland)
Stawki, Warmian-Masurian Voivodeship (north Poland)